The Clark Round Barn was an historic building located near Tyrone in rural Monroe County, Iowa, United States. It was built in 1908 for Charles Henry Clark, Sr.   The building was a true round barn that measured  in diameter. The siding was pine and the original cedar singles had been replaced in the 1960s. The barn was listed on the National Register of Historic Places since 1986. It was torn down in 1999.

References

Infrastructure completed in 1908
Buildings and structures in Monroe County, Iowa
National Register of Historic Places in Monroe County, Iowa
Barns on the National Register of Historic Places in Iowa
Round barns in Iowa
Demolished buildings and structures in Iowa
Buildings and structures demolished in 1999